St Margaret's Ward is a ward in the Central Area of Ipswich, Suffolk, England. It returns three councillors to Ipswich Borough Council.

It is designated Middle Layer Super Output Area Ipswich 005 by the Office of National Statistics. It is composed of 5 Lower Layer Super Output Areas.

Ipswich Borough Council Elections

Ipswich Borough Council Elections in the 2020s

Ipswich Borough Council Elections in the 2010s

Ipswich Borough Council Elections in the 2000s

Suffolk County Council Elections

Notable buildings in St Margaret's Ward
Christchurch Mansion in Christchurch Park

References

 
Wards of Ipswich